Clarence Evans is an American former Negro league pitcher who played in the 1940s.

Evans attended Armstrong High School in Washington, D.C., where he was a star baseball player. He went on to play for the Homestead Grays during their 1948 Negro World Series championship season, and played for the club again the following year.

References

External links
 and Seamheads 
Clarence Evans biography from Society for American Baseball Research (SABR)

Year of birth missing
Place of birth missing
Homestead Grays players
Baseball pitchers